The Acura RLX is a mid-size flagship luxury car manufactured by Honda and sold under their Acura division, released in 2013, succeeding the RL. The RLX was discontinued in 2020.

Background and development
The Acura Legend was a very successful vehicle to launch Acura as a separate division, and combined with sales of the Integra this resulted in Acura outselling longtime luxury marques BMW and Mercedes-Benz as well as Toyota's new luxury division Lexus. However, the successor RL sold below expectations due to relatively tight interior for its size, the lack of a V8 performance engine option and better handling rear-wheel drive experience, and/or relatively expensive compared to its rivals. 

An October 2009 Car and Driver blog cited a dinner with Acura executives who acknowledged that the introduction of the new, larger, and in some guises, more powerful, fourth generation Acura TL made it difficult to market the then-current RL. In November 2009, an Autoweek article reported that new Honda CEO Takanobu Ito told Automotive News that Acura is going to change course. Speaking of the worldwide economy before the collapse of investment bank Lehman Brothers, Ito said through an interpreter, "Pre-Lehman, we did have the idea to produce more multicylinder engines... I see the future of Acura as a merger of BMW and Audi -- something between high performance and high technology." As a result of this midstream change, Acura will be in a "low-growth period of developing new products," Ito said. "We were thinking that we could come up with glamorous, gorgeous products that would sell. Now, our premium products will be expressed in advanced environmental technologies, rather than glamorous things attached to the product," he said.

RLX Concept

On April 4, 2012, Acura unveiled the RLX Concept, a replacement for the RL sedan, at the 2012 New York International Auto Show. The production model, which changed little from the concept, was unveiled globally at the Los Angeles Auto Show later that year.

History

The RLX went on sale on March 15, 2013. Production of the RL ended at the Saitama facility on June 16, 2012, to begin factory changeover to the RLX. The RLX is offered as two versions, a front-wheel drive base model equipped with All-Wheel Steer (P-AWS) four-wheel steering system, and a hybrid variant featuring SH-AWD as Acura's flagship.

RLX Sport Hybrid
The RLX Sport Hybrid debuted at the 2013 Los Angeles Auto Show.  Overall vehicle weight was up 357 lbs, with weight distribution (front:rear) improved from 61:39 in non-hybrids to 57:43 in hybrid models. It was offered as the Honda Legend in Japan. US sales began during September 2014, with 250 models produced for the 2014 model year and an additional 250 produced for the 2016 model year.

Powertrain

The fuel saving VCM system worked in either 6 or 3 cylinder configurations; the new model used more sophisticated engine mounts which bypassed the need for a 4-cylinder mode which would result in a lower NVH.

Hybrid models featured the VCM capability as well, with an added start-stop system to boost fuel economy as well as the ability to operate entirely on electric power up to 58 miles per hour with light throttle usage. The hybrid also used a 7-speed dual clutch transmission using an integrated 35 kW (47 hp) electric motor, with each rear wheel being powered by a 27-kilowatt (36 hp) electric motor, with 2 rear electric motors total. This setup gave the hybrid a torque vectoring all-wheel drive system with rear wheels strictly electrically powered.

A 72-cell 1.3 kWh 66-pound lithium-ion battery pack was placed behind the rear seat. EPA estimated fuel economy was improved to 29/30/29 mpg (city/highway/combined). It was given a CARB emissions rating of LEV III SULEV30 compared with the non-hybrid's ULEV-2 ranking.

Chassis
The front subframe was made from aluminum.  Front suspension used a double wishbone layout, while the rear was a multi-link with a Precision All Wheel Steer (P-AWS, front-drive models only) system. ZF Sachs (ZF) supplied the "Amplitude Reactive Dampers" with two piston valves per damper. 18-inch wheels were standard, and 19-inch wheels with a noise reducing harmonic construction feature were optional for non-hybrids and standard on hybrids, a feature similar to that used in the previous face-lifted 2011 Acura RL.  Suspension tuning was oriented towards the sportier side of comfort.

Interior
Standard perforated leather 12-way (4-way lumbar) front seats were heated and, on the "Advance" option package models, cooled, and rear seat room had been significantly improved.  Rear legroom was similar to full size luxury flagship sedans (non-extended wheelbase versions).  An 8-inch navigation screen along with a 7-inch touch screen display for audio, climate, and various shortcut controls with AcuraLink were also standard.

An optional flagship 14-speaker Krell audio system replaced the Bose system used on the previous model RL.  A mid-level 14-speaker ELS Studio Premium system using Panasonic components was also optional.  The base ELS Premium system used 10-speakers.

Hybrid models included an electronic transmission gear selector, heads-up display, acoustic (PVB layered glass for all doors and the windshield, and standard navigation.  The 14-speaker ELS Studio Premium system was standard, and the Krell system was optional. GPS-linked climate control, voice recognition, and a keyless access system with a push-button start were also standard.

Exterior

The RLX was the first Acura model to offer standard Jewel-Eye LED headlamps. Each unit uses five separate LED light sources (four low beam, one high beam) with ten polished lenses (eight low beam, two high beam). The headlights no longer swivel through corners as they did on the previous generation RL. The hood, front fenders, and outer door panels are made from aluminum, aluminum use in the RLX saved a total of 79.1 lbs compared with steel components.

The hybrid came standard with LED foglamps.

Safety
All models came standard with a multi-angle rear-view backup camera,  Forward Collision Warning system (FCW) and lane departure warning. An automatic braking front precrash system with front seatbelt electronic pretensioners was available, as was a lane keeping assist system and adaptive cruise control. Optional Adaptive Cruise Control with Low-Speed Follow, Blind Spot Information System and automotive head-up display were available. For 2016 a Surround View camera system was made optional.

Brakes with Brake Hold Control holding the car at a stop without the use of a brake pedal, Electronic Brake Distribution, Brake Assist, an Agile Handling Assist that applies the brakes on the wheels inside a curve, and Vehicle Stability Assist were standard.

1 vehicle structure also rated "Good"
2 strength-to-weight ratio: 5.18

Facelift
For the 2018 model year, the RLX received a mid-cycle change; sales began in November 2017. The updated RLX incorporated Acura's new design language featuring its diamond pentagon grille, redesigned front and rear fascias, redesigned LED tail lights, LED head lights, a new wheel design, a redesigned hood, and chrome exhaust finishers. Changes to the interior had been made, including a new front seat design, steering wheel, wood trim, and an added Espresso interior color option. RLX featured AcuraWatch suite of safety features as standard, including an Acura first- Traffic Jam Assist and blind spot monitoring. The front-wheel-drive RLX received a new 10-speed automatic transmission.

US sales began in November 2017.

Discontinuation
2020 was the final model year for the RLX as the market shifts towards SUV / crossovers. As a result, the TLX became Acura's flagship sedan. Although similar, the RLX larger than the current TLX. The 2021 TLX will take up an elevated position in the lineup as "the quickest, best-handling and most well-appointed [Acura] sedan".

The Honda Legend, upon which the RLX was based, was initially continued on in other markets, including Japan.  In June 2021, it was announced that the Legend would be discontinued at the end of that production year.

References

External links

Acura RLX 

RLX
Cars introduced in 2012
2020s cars
Executive cars
Sedans
Front-wheel-drive vehicles
All-wheel-drive vehicles
Flagship vehicles
Hybrid electric cars